Lumpia Semarang or in old spelling known as loenpia semarang (Javanese: lunpiyah, Hanacaraka: ꦭꦸꦤ꧀ꦥꦶꦪꦃ, Pegon: لونبيياه) is an Indonesian appetizer or snack dish rollade-like consisting of rebung, egg, dried shrimp with chicken meat and/or prawn in a crepe-like pastry skin called "lumpia wrapper". Lumpia Semarang is a typical Lumpia the city of Semarang, the origin of this spring roll is from Semarang, Central Java.

Semarang lumpia is served either deep-fried or unfried, as the filling is already cooked.

See also

 Cuisine of Indonesia
 List of Indonesian snacks
 Lumpia
 Sumpia
 Spring roll
 Seblak

References

Appetizers
Indonesian cuisine
Kue
Javanese cuisine
Street food in Indonesia